List of Marvel Cinematic Universe television series actors may refer to:

 List of Marvel Cinematic Universe television series actors (Marvel Television) – actors who have appeared in television series produced by Marvel Television
 List of Marvel Cinematic Universe television series actors (Marvel Studios) – actors who have appeared in television series produced by Marvel Studios